Adelaide of Eilenburg ( 1030 – 26 January 1071) was a German noblewoman.  She was a daughter of Margrave Dedi I of the Saxon Eastern March and his first wife, Oda of Lusatia.

In 1060, she married Margrave Ernest of Austria during his reign and became Margravine of Austria.  He was a member of the House of Babenberg; she was his first wife.  Adelaide and Ernest had four children:
 Leopold II (d. 1095)
 Adalbert I, Count of Pernegg (d. 1100)
 a daughter, who married Count Herman I of Poigen
 Justitia, married Count Otto II of Dießen-Wolfratshausen

1030s births
1071 deaths
11th-century German nobility
11th-century German women
Austrian royal consorts
House of Wettin
Margravines of Germany
11th-century women of the Holy Roman Empire
Women of medieval Austria